Allan Ellis (August 19, 1951 – September 18, 2013) was an American professional football player who was a cornerback for nine seasons in the National Football League (NFL). He played college football for the UCLA Bruins. In 1977, Ellis was named to his lone Pro Bowl, and is the first Chicago Bears cornerback to be named.

On September 18, 2013, Ellis died in Chicago.

References

 Former Bears CB Allan Ellis dies at 62

1951 births
2013 deaths
Players of American football from Los Angeles
American football cornerbacks
UCLA Bruins football players
Chicago Bears players
San Diego Chargers players
National Conference Pro Bowl players